Flavius Moschianus (floruit 512)  was a politician of the Eastern Roman Empire; he was appointed consul  for 512.

Life 
Moschianus was a son of Sabinianus Magnus, magister militum per Illyricum (479-481), and the brother of Sabinianus, consul in 505. He married a niece of the emperor Anastasius I; their son Anastasius Paulus Probus Moschianus Probus Magnus was consul in 518.

References
 Brian Croke, Count Marcellinus and His Chronicle, Oxford University Press, 2001, p. 89.

6th-century Romans
6th-century Roman consuls
Imperial Roman consuls
Year of birth unknown
Year of death unknown